This listing contains taxa of plants in the division Cycadophyta, recorded from South Africa. Cycads  are seed plants with a very long fossil history that were formerly more abundant and more diverse than they are today. They typically have a stout and woody (ligneous) trunk with a crown of large, hard and stiff, evergreen leaves. They usually have pinnate leaves. The species are dioecious, therefore the individual plants of a species are either male or female. Cycads vary in size from having trunks only a few centimeters to several meters tall. They typically grow very slowly and live very long, with some specimens known to be as much as 1,000 years old. Because of their superficial resemblance, they are sometimes mistaken for palms or ferns, but they are not closely related to either group.

Cycads are gymnosperms (naked seeded), meaning their unfertilized seeds are open to the air to be directly fertilized by pollination, as contrasted with angiosperms, which have enclosed seeds with more complex fertilization arrangements. Cycads have very specialized pollinators, usually a specific species of beetle. They have been reported to fix nitrogen in association with various cyanobacteria living in the roots (the "coralloid" roots). Cycads all over the world are in decline, with four species on the brink of extinction and seven species have fewer than 100 plants left in the wild.

23,420 species of vascular plant have been recorded in South Africa, making it the sixth most species-rich country in the world and the most species-rich country on the African continent. Of these, 153 species are considered to be threatened. Nine biomes have been described in South Africa: Fynbos, Succulent Karoo, desert, Nama Karoo, grassland, savanna, Albany thickets, the Indian Ocean coastal belt, and forests.

The 2018 South African National Biodiversity Institute's National Biodiversity Assessment plant checklist lists 35,130 taxa in the phyla Anthocerotophyta (hornworts (6)), Anthophyta (flowering plants(33534)), Bryophyta (mosses (685)), Cycadophyta (cycads (42)), Lycopodiophyta (Lycophytes(45)), Marchantiophyta (liverworts (376)), Pinophyta (conifers (33)), and Pteridophyta {cryptograms(408)).

Listing
Cycas madagascariensis Miq.
Encephalartos aemulans Vorster, endemic 
Encephalartos altensteinii Lehm. endemic 
Encephalartos arenarius R.A.Dyer, endemic 
Encephalartos brevifoliolatus Vorster, endemic 
Encephalartos caffer (Thunb.) Lehm. endemic 
Encephalartos cerinus Lavranos & D.L.Goode, endemic 
Encephalartos cupidus R.A.Dyer, endemic 
Encephalartos cycadifolius (Jacq.) Lehm. endemic 
Encephalartos dolomiticus Lavranos & D.L.Goode, endemic 
Encephalartos dyerianus Lavranos & D.L.Goode, endemic 
Encephalartos eugene-maraisii I.Verd. endemic 
Encephalartos eugene-maraisii I.Verd. subsp. middelburgensis Lavranos & D.L.Goode
Encephalartos ferox G.Bertol. indigenous 
Encephalartos friderici-guilielmi Lehm. endemic 
Encephalartos ghellinckii Lem. endemic 
Encephalartos heenanii R.A.Dyer. indigenous 
Encephalartos hirsutus P.J.H.Hurter, endemic 
Encephalartos horridus (Jacq.) Lehm. endemic 
Encephalartos humilis I.Verd. endemic 
Encephalartos inopinus R.A.Dyer, endemic 
Encephalartos laevifolius Stapf & Burtt Davy, indigenous 
Encephalartos lanatus Stapf & Burtt Davy, endemic 
Encephalartos latifrons Lehm. endemic 
Encephalartos lebomboensis I.Verd. indigenous 
Encephalartos lehmannii Lehm. endemic 
Encephalartos longifolius (Jacq.) Lehm. endemic 
Encephalartos middelburgensis Vorster, Robbertse & S.van der Westh. endemic 
Encephalartos msinganus Vorster, endemic 
Encephalartos natalensis R.A.Dyer & I.Verd. endemic 
Encephalartos ngoyanus I.Verd. indigenous 
Encephalartos nubimontanus P.J.H.Hurter, endemic 
Encephalartos paucidentatus Stapf & Burtt Davy, indigenous 
Encephalartos princeps R.A.Dyer, endemic 
Encephalartos senticosus Vorster, indigenous 
Encephalartos transvenosus Stapf & Burtt Davy, endemic 
Encephalartos trispinosus (Hook.) R.A.Dyer, endemic 
Encephalartos umbeluziensis R.A.Dyer (Encephalartos striatus Stapf & Burtt Davy) 
Encephalartos venetus Vorster 
Encephalartos villosus Lem. indigenous 
Encephalartos woodii Sander, endemic 
Stangeria eriopus (Kunze) Baill. indigenous

References

South African plant biodiversity lists
Cycads